Vera Csapody (1890–1985) was a Hungarian botanist, author, and botanical illustrator known for studying and painting the flora of Hungary with Sándor Jávorka.  Over 11,000 of her illustrations are held by the Hungarian Natural History Museum.

References 

1890 births
1985 deaths
Hungarian women scientists
20th-century Hungarian botanists
Hungarian illustrators
Hungarian women illustrators